The 1987–88 Sporting de Gijón season was the 27th season of the club in La Liga, the 13th consecutive after its last promotion.

Overview 
Despite a bad start of the season, Sporting ended the league in the ninth position.

In their fifth participation in the UEFA Cup, the club was eliminated in the first round by Milan, despite winning the first leg at El Molinón by 1–0.

Squad

Competitions

La Liga

Results by round

League table

Matches

Copa del Rey

Matches

UEFA Cup

Squad statistics

Appearances and goals

|}

Notes

References

External links
Profile at BDFutbol
Official website

Sporting de Gijón seasons
Sporting de Gijon